Thull is a surname. People with that name include:

 Hans Rudolf Thull (born 1945), German artist
 Ketty Thull (1905-1987), Luxembourg cook, educator and cookbook writer
 Marcel Thull (born 1951), Luxembourgian cyclist who competed at the 1976 Summer Olympics
 Roger Thull (born 1939), Luxembourgian cyclist who competed at the 1960 Summer Olympics

See also

 Thul, a town of Jacobabad District, Sindh Province, Pakistan